Dustin Ryan Fowler (born December 29, 1994) is an American professional baseball outfielder who is a free agent. He has played in Major League Baseball (MLB) for the New York Yankees, Oakland Athletics and Pittsburgh Pirates.

Career

New York Yankees
Fowler attended West Laurens High School in Dexter, Georgia. He committed to play college baseball at Georgia Southern University. The New York Yankees selected Fowler in the 18th round of the 2013 Major League Baseball draft. He signed with the Yankees, made his professional debut with the Gulf Coast Yankees and spent the whole season there, batting .241 with nine RBIs in 30 games. He played in 2014 with the Charleston RiverDogs where he compiled a .257 batting average with nine home runs and 41 RBIs in 66 games, and in 2015 with both Charleston and the Tampa Yankees where he batted a combined .298/.334/.394 with five home runs, 70 RBIs and 30 stolen bases. He played in the Arizona Fall League after the 2015 season.

Fowler received a non-roster invitation to spring training in 2016 and played that season with the Trenton Thunder where he batted .281 with 12 home runs, 88 RBIs, and 25 stolen bases in 132 games. He was again invited to spring training in 2017, and started the season with the Scranton/Wilkes-Barre RailRiders. He was ranked as the 98th best prospect in baseball by MLB Pipeline at the time of his call-up. In 70 games for Scranton/Wilkes-Barre prior to his promotion, he was slashing .293/.329/.542 with 13 home runs and 43 RBIs.

Fowler made his major league debut on June 29, 2017, after a nearly three-hour rain delay, with the Yankees facing the Chicago White Sox on the road.  During the first inning, he ran into a rail while chasing a fly ball, hitting his knee on a sharp edge of an electrical box. He collapsed to the ground and was carted off the field, before being diagnosed with an open rupture of the right patellar tendon. He was ruled out for the season. He underwent surgery that night at Rush University Medical Center. Fowler would have led off the next inning for his first major league plate appearance.

Oakland Athletics 
On July 31, 2017 the Yankees traded Fowler to the Oakland Athletics, along with fellow prospects Jorge Mateo and James Kaprielian, for starting pitcher Sonny Gray. On December 15, 2017, Fowler sued the White Sox and the Illinois state agency that manages their ballpark, Guaranteed Rate Field, for allegedly causing his June 29 injury. His lawsuit, which was filed in the Circuit Court of Cook County, according to the Chicago Sun-Times, claimed negligence on the part of the White Sox and the Illinois Sports Facilities Authority in not properly securing the unpadded electrical box he crashed into. In 2018, the defendants tried, and failed, to have the case moved to federal court and dismissed, failing in their claim that Fowler, as an MLB player covered by the league's union contract, could not sue in state court for the injury. As of March 2020, the case was still pending in state court.

Fowler began the 2018 season with the Nashville Sounds. The Athletics promoted him to the major leagues on May 9, and he went to bat for the first time in the major leagues that night. He started his first game for Oakland on May 11, and got his first major league hit off Yankee pitcher Sonny Gray, the player he was traded for. On May 18, 2018, he hit his first major league home run off Marco Estrada in a 3-1 victory over the Blue Jays. On August 2, he was sent back down to Triple A Nashville. On February 21, 2021, Fowler was designated for assignment by the Athletics after the Trevor Rosenthal signing was made official. At the time of his designation, Fowler had not appeared in an MLB game since 2018.

Pittsburgh Pirates
On February 24, 2021, Fowler was traded to the Pittsburgh Pirates in exchange for cash considerations. After starting the season batting .171/.239/.195 with no home runs and two RBIs in 18 games, Fowler was designated for assignment after Todd Frazier was added to the roster, on April 22. On April 28, Fowler was outrighted to the alternate training site. Fowler appeared in 13 games for the Triple-A Indianapolis Indians, hitting .270 with three home runs and six RBIs. On August 7, 2021, Fowler was released by the Pirates.

Miami Marlins
On August 13, 2021, Fowler signed a minor league contract with the Miami Marlins. He was assigned to the Triple-A Jacksonville Jumbo Shrimp. He elected free agency on November 7, 2021.

References

External links
, or Retrosheet

1994 births
Living people
Baseball players from Georgia (U.S. state)
People from Laurens County, Georgia
Major League Baseball outfielders
New York Yankees players
Oakland Athletics players
Pittsburgh Pirates players
Gulf Coast Yankees players
Charleston RiverDogs players
Tampa Yankees players
Surprise Saguaros players
Trenton Thunder players
Scranton/Wilkes-Barre RailRiders players
Nashville Sounds players
Las Vegas Aviators players
Indianapolis Indians players
Jacksonville Jumbo Shrimp players
Florida Complex League Pirates players